Michael Doherty (born 8 March 1961) is an English former professional footballer who played in the Football League, as a forward.

References

Sources
Profile at Neil Brown

1961 births
Living people
Footballers from Liverpool
English footballers
Association football forwards
Basingstoke Town F.C. players
Reading F.C. players
Slough Town F.C. players
Yeovil Town F.C. players
Wycombe Wanderers F.C. players
Weymouth F.C. players
Maidstone United F.C. (1897) players
Runcorn F.C. Halton players
Farnborough F.C. players
Macclesfield Town F.C. players
Altrincham F.C. players
English Football League players